Sigel is the name of some places in the U.S. state of Wisconsin:
Sigel, Chippewa County, Wisconsin, a town
Sigel, Wood County, Wisconsin, a town